The 75th Infantry Division was a German infantry division in World War II. It was formed on 26 August 1939.

War Crimes

The 75th division participated in the Massacre at Babi Yar

Orders of Battle

75. Infanterie-Division 1939

Infanterie-Regiment 172
Infanterie-Regiment 202
Infanterie-Regiment 222
Artillerie-Regiment 157
Pionier-Battalion 175
Aufklärungs-Abteilung 175
Panzerabwehr-Abteilung 175
Infanterie-Divisions-Nachrichten-Abteilung 175
Infanterie-Divisions-Nachschubtruppen 175

75. Infanterie-Division 1944
Grenadier-Regiment 172
Füsilier-Regiment 202
Grenadier-Regiment 222
Divisions-Füsilier-Battalion 75
Artillerie-Regiment 175
Feldersatz-Battalion 175
Pionier-Battalion 175
Panzerjäger-Abteilung 175
Infanterie-Divisions-Nachrichten-Abteilung 175
Kommandeur der Infanterie-Divisions-Nachschubtruppen 175

Commanding officers
Generalleutnant Ing. Ernst Hammer, 26 August 1939 – 5 September 1942
Generalleutnant Erich Diestel, 5 September 1942 – 12 September 1942
Generalleutnant Helmuth Beukemann, 15 September 1942 – 9 July 1944
Generalmajor Karl Arning, 10 July 1944 – 5 April 1945
Generalmajor Lothar Berger, 6 April 1945 – May 1945
Oberst Gerhard Matthaiss, May 1945 – 8 May 1945

References

External links

0*075
Military units and formations established in 1939
1939 establishments in Germany
Military units and formations disestablished in 1945